Douglas Riemer (6 August 1917 – 26 July 1996) was a South African cricketer. He played in 37 first-class matches between 1934/35 and 1954/55.

See also
 List of Eastern Province representative cricketers

References

External links
 

1917 births
1996 deaths
South African cricketers
Eastern Province cricketers
Free State cricketers
Griqualand West cricketers
Cricketers from Port Elizabeth